Conca may refer to:

Places

France
Conca, Corse-du-Sud, a municipality of Corsica

Italy
Conca (river), a river that flows into the Adriatic Sea
Conca della Campania, a municipality of the Province of Caserta
Conca Casale, a municipality of the Province of Isernia
Mercatino Conca, a municipality of the Province of Pesaro and Urbino
Conca dei Marini, a municipality of the Province of Salerno

Spain
Conca de Dalt, a municipality of Catalonia

Other uses
Concerto for Strings ("Conca") in B-flat major, a composition by Antonio Vivaldi

People with the surname
 Carlos Conca (born 1954), Chilean mathematician, engineer and scientist
 Darío Conca (1983 – ), Argentinian footballer
 Giovanni Conca, (c.1690–1771), Italian painter; see Santa Maria della Luce, Rome
 Giuseppe Conca (1904–1972), Italian Olympic weightlifter
 Reece Conca (born 1992), Australian rules footballer
 Sebastiano Conca (c.1680–1764), Italian painter
 Tommaso Conca (1734–1822), Italian baroque painter

See also
 Conco, a town in the province of Vicenza, Veneto, Italy